Kâzım Paşa Hazretleri Özalp (17 February 1882 – 6 June 1968) was a Turkish military officer of Albanian descent, politician, and one of the leading figures in the Turkish War of Independence.

Biography

Born in Köprülü (now Veles, Republic of Macedonia), in the Kosovo Vilayet of the Ottoman Empire into an Albanian family, Kâzım Fikri graduated from the Ottoman military school in 1902 and completed the College of War in 1905. Kâzım Özalp was involved to 31 March Incident in 1909. He was a military commander during the Balkan wars. In 1917, he was promoted to the rank of the colonel. He was one of the military commanders who organized resistance groups against the occupation of Izmir. During the Turkish War of Independence, he fought at several fronts. In 1921, Kâzım Özalp was promoted to the rank General for his success at the Battle of Sakarya. After the Kurdish Sheikh Said Rebellion was subdued, he contributed to the Report for Reform of the East, which advised to establish Inspectorates General in the eastern provinces of Turkey and crush the Kurdish elite in the region.

Already a member of the first term of the parliament of the newly established Republic as an MP from Balıkesir Province, Kâzım Fikri served as the Minister of Defense in several cabinets from 1921 to 1925, and later from 1935 to 1939. He was elected Speaker of the Turkish Grand National Assembly from 1924 to 1935. In 1950, he was elected to the parliament as an MP from Van Province. He retired from active politics in 1954. He was rumored to have been a Bektashi possibly because of his opposition to the decision to close Bektashi centers (Tekke).

Kâzım Özalp wrote his memoirs in his book Milli Mücadele ("National Warfare"). He died on 6 June 1968 in Ankara. His remains were transferred to the Turkish State Cemetery.

See also
List of high-ranking commanders of the Turkish War of Independence

References

Who is who

External links
 

1882 births
1968 deaths
People from Veles Municipality
People from Kosovo vilayet
Republican People's Party (Turkey) politicians
Ministers of National Defence of Turkey
Government ministers of Turkey
Speakers of the Parliament of Turkey
Deputies of Balıkesir
Deputies of Van
Ottoman Army officers
Turkish Army generals
Ottoman military personnel of the Balkan Wars
Ottoman military personnel of World War I
Turkish military personnel of the Greco-Turkish War (1919–1922)
Malta exiles
Turkish people of Albanian descent
Ottoman Military Academy alumni
Ottoman Military College alumni
Recipients of the Medal of Independence with Red-Green Ribbon (Turkey)
Burials at Turkish State Cemetery
Members of the 1st government of Turkey
Members of the 2nd government of Turkey
Members of the 8th government of Turkey
Members of the 9th government of Turkey
Members of the 10th government of Turkey
Members of the 2nd Parliament of Turkey
Turkish nationalists